Thurnau is a municipality in the district Kulmbach, Germany.

It is known for golfing as well as its potteries.

Thurnau is known for transmitter Thurnau, the medium wave transmission site for Deutschlandfunk, a German national information radio station.

City arrangement

Thurnau is arranged in the following boroughs:

Famous people

Famous people born in Thurnau
Carl von Linde, (11 June 1842) was a German engineer who developed refrigeration and gas separation technologies.

References

Kulmbach (district)